First on the Moon: A Voyage with Neil Armstrong, Michael Collins and Edwin E. Aldrin, Jr. is a 1970 book by the crew of the Apollo 11 Moon landing (Neil Armstrong, Michael Collins, Buzz Aldrin) in collaboration with Gene Farmer and Dora Jane Hamblin. Epilogue by Arthur C. Clarke in the first edition. It describes the events leading up to and during the Apollo 11 mission, the first crewed landing on the Moon. It was first published in June 1970 by Little, Brown and Company.

References

1970 non-fiction books
Spaceflight books
Apollo 11
Buzz Aldrin
Neil Armstrong
Books by astronauts
Michael Collins (astronaut)